Pangonius is a genus within the horse-fly family (Tabanidae), often misspelled as Pangonia; Latreille originally published the name as Pangonius in 1802, emending it in 1804 to Pangonia, but the emendation is not valid under the International Code of Zoological Nomenclature. Some species that were earlier placed in this genus are now in the genus Philoliche.

Species
Pangonius affinis (Loew, 1859)
Pangonius alluaudi Séguy, 1930
Pangonius apertus (Loew, 1859)
Pangonius argentatus (Szilády, 1923)
Pangonius brancoi Dias, 1984
Pangonius brevicornis (Kröber, 1921)
Pangonius dimidiatus (Loew, 1859)
Pangonius fasciatus (Latreille, 1811)
Pangonius ferrugineus (Meigen, 1804)
Pangonius flavocinctus (Szilády, 1923)
Pangonius florae Leclercq & Maldès, 1987
Pangonius fulvipes (Loew, 1859)
Pangonius fumidus (Loew, 1859)
Pangonius funebris (Macquart, 1846)
Pangonius granatensis (Strobl, 1906)
Pangonius griseipennis (Loew, 1859)
Pangonius hassani (Leclercq, 1968)
Pangonius haustellatus (Fabricius, 1781)
Pangonius hermanni (Kröber, 1921)
Pangonius kraussei Surcouf, 1921
Pangonius lucidus (Szilády, 1923)
Pangonius mauritanus (Linnaeus, 1767)
Pangonius micans (Meigen, 1820)
Pangonius obscuratus (Loew, 1859)
Pangonius pictus (Macquart, 1834)
Pangonius powelli (Séguy, 1930)
Pangonius pyritosus (Loew, 1859)
Pangonius raclinae Leclercq, 1960
Pangonius rhynchocephalus (Kröber, 1921)
Pangonius seitzianus (Enderlein, 1931)
Pangonius sinensis (Enderlein, 1932)
Pangonius sobradieli (Séguy, 1934)
Pangonius striatus (Szilády, 1923)
Pangonius theodori Zeegers, Kravchenko & Müller, 2013
Pangonius variegatus (Fabricius, 1805)
Pangonius villosus (Szilády, 1923)
Pangonius vittipennis (Kröber, 1921)

Formerly placed here
Pangonius longirostris, now Philoliche longirostris (Hardwicke, 1823)

References

Tabanidae
Taxa named by Pierre André Latreille
Brachycera genera
Diptera of Europe
Diptera of Africa